Jacktown, sometimes incorrectly referred to as "Osborn" (another small settlement along the same railroad a few miles west of Jacktown) was a small village in Empire Township, Leelanau County, Michigan, United States located off Oviatt/County Line Road near Empire in the early 1900s. Benzie County lies on the other side of Oviatt Road. Like many small "company towns", Jacktown sprang up along a railroad, known as the Empire and Southeastern Railroad, a logging railroad turned passenger railroad that connected Empire Junction with Manistee and Northeastern Railroad south in Benzie County.

Today, it is no more than a clearing in the woods.  All that is left of Jacktown is the old abandoned railroad grade and a few basements and foundations of houses and other buildings. One of several local legends speculates the town depopulated after local water wells abruptly dried up one summer, however, Jacktown most likely died when Empire and Southeast Railroad went out of existence in the 1920s. Many of the local elderly in the area still remember Jacktown and/or stories of it, however, most information been lost with time. The Bland Cemetery is located near the clearing where Jacktown used to be, with many former residents buried there. Jacktown is a chapter subject in the book Ghost Towns of Michigan written by local historian Lawrence (Larry) Wakefield of Traverse City.

Ghost towns in Michigan
Former populated places in Leelanau County, Michigan